Blanchette Landing Access consists of  in St. Charles County, Missouri. It is located in the city of St. Charles, and provides access to the Missouri River. 

The area consists of a boat launch, parking lot, pavilion, and restrooms. Fishing is permitted in the conservation area, and there are no designated trails.

References

Protected areas of St. Charles County, Missouri
Conservation Areas of Missouri